Nannophya australis is a species of dragonfly of the family Libellulidae, 
known as the Australian pygmyfly. 
It inhabits boggy seepages and swamps in eastern Australia.
It is a tiny dragonfly with black and red markings.

Gallery

See also
 List of Odonata species of Australia

References

Libellulidae
Odonata of Australia
Endemic fauna of Australia
Taxa named by Friedrich Moritz Brauer
Insects described in 1865